Journey to the Outer Limits is a 1973 American documentary film directed by Alexander Grasshoff. It was nominated for an Academy Award for Best Documentary Feature.

See also
 List of American films of 1973

References

External links

Journey to the Outer Limits at David L. Wolper Co.

1973 films
1970s English-language films
American documentary films
Films directed by Alex Grasshoff
American independent films
1973 documentary films
Films scored by Billy Goldenberg
National Geographic Society films
1970s American films